is a Japanese professional baseball outfielder for the Saitama Seibu Lions in Japan's Nippon Professional Baseball.

External links

NPB.com

1980 births
Living people
Baseball people from Okayama Prefecture
Japanese baseball players
Nippon Professional Baseball outfielders
Chiba Lotte Marines players
Orix Buffaloes players
Saitama Seibu Lions players